is a Japanese manga series written and illustrated by Keita Yatera. It was serialized in Shogakukan's seinen manga magazine Weekly Big Comic Spirits from March 2019 to May 2021.

Publication
Written and illustrated by Keita Yatera, Ponkotsu Ponko was serialized in Shogakukan's seinen manga magazine Weekly Big Comic Spirits from March 25, 2019, to May 24, 2021. Shogakukan collected its chapters in ten tankōbon volumes, released from July 30, 2019, to May 28, 2021.

Volume list

Reception
In 2020, the manga was one of the 50 nominees for the 6th Next Manga Awards.

References

External links
 

Comedy anime and manga
Seinen manga
Shogakukan manga